The Saddle Club Footbridge is a pedestrian bridge over Rock Creek in Washington, D.C. completed in 1934.  It is one of eight such pedestrian bridges completed during the Great Depression.  It has square-cut
ashlar stone abutments, a concrete arch deck, and wooden railings.  The bridge cost $3,830 to construct.

References

Bridges over Rock Creek (Potomac River tributary)
Bridges completed in 1934
Stone arch bridges in the United States
Pedestrian bridges in the United States
Bridges in Washington, D.C.
1934 establishments in Washington, D.C.